Fritz Ostermayer (born 1956 in Schattendorf) is an Austrian author, DJ and musician. He lives and works in Vienna as radio broadcaster ("Im Sumpf"/FM4). 

Ostermayer compiled a CD about funeral marches: "Dead & Gone" (released by Trikont). His debut solo album, "Kitsch Concrète", featuring his vocals in English and German, including a duet with Clara Ostermayer, was released via Mego in 2003.

Publications
"Gott ist ein Tod aus der Steckdose"
"Hermes Phettberg räumt seine Wohnung zam"
"Die Sumpfprotokolle" (together with Thomas Edlinger)
"Die Gutmenschenprotokolle" (together with Thomas Edlinger) 
"Who shot Immanence" (together with Johannes Grenzfurthner and Thomas Edlinger)

References

1956 births
Living people
Austrian electronic musicians
Austrian male musicians